Gul Panag (born Gulkirat Kaur Panag, 3 January 1979; Chandigarh, India) is an Indian actress, voice actress, model, and former beauty queen who competed in the Miss Universe pageant. Panag began her career in Bollywood with the 2003 film Dhoop. Since then, she has worked in films like Jurm and the TV series Kashmeer. Her films include Dor, Dhoop, Manorama Six Feet Under, Hello, Straight, and Ab Tak Chhappan 2.

She played a commoner, fighting hard to save her husband from going to the gallows, in the 2006 Nagesh Kukunoor film, Dor. In 2008, she acted in the films Hello and Summer 2007. In 2009, she appeared in the movie Straight. She featured in Rann in a role attempting to stop her boyfriend from doing the right thing. Panag appeared on the front page of Maxim with whom she did a photo shoot in September 2008. She debuted in Punjabi movies with Sarsa. She was the Aam Aadmi Party candidate from Chandigarh for 2014 Lok Sabha Elections.

Early life
Panag started her education in Sangrur, in Punjab. Her father, Lt. Gen. Panag was in the army and the family moved to different places across India and abroad. As a result of this, she studied in 14 different schools including Kendriya Vidyalayas (Chandigarh, Mhow, Leh and Wellington, Tamil Nadu), The Lawrence School, Lovedale and the International School of Lusaka, Zambia. She did her Bachelors in Mathematics from Punjabi University, Patiala, and Masters in Political Science from Panjab University, Chandigarh. As a student, Panag was interested in sports and public speaking.  She won numerous state and national level debate competitions, including two gold medals at the Annual National Inter University Debate competition.

Career

Modeling
Panag  won the Miss India title in 1999, and was crowned Miss Beautiful Smile at the same pageant. She participated in the Miss Universe 1999 pageant.

Brand endorsement
She has appeared in numerous advertisements on television and print media and is the brand ambassador for Tata Sky, along with Aamir Khan. 

Panag  was the Twitter Face for the Wills Lifestyle India Fashion Week held in 2009, to cover the happenings/proceedings on the micro-blogging site.

Social activism
Gul Panag runs the Colonel Shamsher Singh Foundation, an NGO that works towards a variety of causes including gender equality, education and disaster management. She served on the advisory board of the Wockhardt Foundation. She also participated in the India Against Corruption movement. She ran at the Delhi Half Marathon in November 2010, but endured eve teasing (sexual harassment) from male runners at the event. She later remarked that the attitude of men in Delhi needed to change and that the city was unsafe for women.

Political career
She was the Aam Aadmi Party candidate from Chandigarh for 2014 Indian general election. She came on third position with 1,08,679 votes, while Kirron Kher won the election with 1,91,362 votes.

Other interests 
She is a half-marathon runner, a biker, and a certified pilot. She debuted on the racing track at the Mahindra Racing's all new M4Electro at the circuit de Calafat in Catalonia, Spain.

A health activist and fitness advocate Gul Panag, co-founded health and fitness startup MobieFit in 2017.

Gul Panag is also a director at Tittar Lodge Productions Private Limited, which provides digital, tailor-made TV content, film and documentary content.

Personal life
Panag married her long-time boyfriend, an airline pilot, Rishi Attari on 13 March 2011 in a Gurdwara in Chandigarh in a traditional Punjabi Sikh ceremony.  The couple has a son named Nihal born in 2018.

Awards
 2007 - Tied - Zee Cine Critics Award for Best Actress, tied with Ayesha Takia for Dor.
 2020 - Nominated – Filmfare OTT Awards for Best Supporting Actress (Drama Series) - Paatal Lok

Filmography

Films

Television

Web series

References

External links

 
 
 Official website

Living people
1977 births
21st-century Indian politicians
21st-century Indian women politicians
Aam Aadmi Party candidates in the 2014 Indian general election
Aam Aadmi Party politicians
Actresses from Chandigarh
Chandigarh politicians
Actresses in Hindi cinema
Actresses in Punjabi cinema
Femina Miss India winners
Female models from Chandigarh
Indian film actresses
Indian web series actresses
Indian voice actresses
Kendriya Vidyalaya alumni
Miss Universe 1999 contestants
Punjabi people
Women in Chandigarh politics
Punjabi University alumni
Panjab University alumni
Indian actor-politicians
Beauty queen-politicians
Zee Cine Awards winners
21st-century Indian actresses